In numerical analysis, a numerical method is a mathematical tool designed to solve numerical problems. The implementation of a numerical method with an appropriate convergence check in a programming language is called a numerical algorithm.

Mathematical definition

 

The problems of which the method consists need not be well-posed. If they are, the method is said to be stable or well-posed.

Consistency
Necessary conditions for a numerical method to effectively approximate  are that  and that  behaves like  when .

 

When  on  the method is said to be strictly consistent.

Convergence
A condition which the method has to satisfy to be a meaningful tool for solving the problem  is convergence:

 

See also
 Numerical methods for ordinary differential equations
 Numerical methods for partial differential equations

References

Numerical analysis